The 542nd Grenadier Division was a German military unit during World War II.

History 
The 542. Sperr-Division was created on 8 July 1944 as part of the 29th Aufstellungswelle in Truppenübungsplatz Stablack. On 15 July 1944, the Division was renamed 542. Grenadier-Division and sent to the Eastern Front as part of Army Group Centre. 
On 12 August 1944, the unit was renamed 542nd Infantry Division, and again renamed on 9 October 1944 to 542nd Volksgrenadier Division.

The Division was pushed into the Hel Peninsula during the Soviet East Prussian offensive and surrendered in April 1945

Commanders
Generalleutnant Karl Löwrick (23 July 1944 - 8 April 1945), KIA

References

German grenadier divisions
Military units and formations disestablished in 1945
Military units and formations established in 1944
Military units and formations disestablished in 1944